Yalaka Gnaneswar Rao (born 25 August 1984) is an Indian cricketer. He is a right-handed batsman and right-arm medium pace bowler. He made his first-class debut in 2000/01 season and also was member of Kochi Tuskers Kerala in 2011 IPL season. He also captain India Under-19 cricket team for tour of England which included future international cricketer like Ambati Rayudu, Suresh Raina, Irfan Pathan and Timil Patel.

References

External links
 

1984 births
Living people
Indian cricketers
Andhra cricketers
Cricketers from Vijayawada
South Zone cricketers
Kochi Tuskers Kerala cricketers